Riffa Fort is a fort in Riffa, Bahrain.

History 
It was built during the reign of Sheikh Salman bin Ahmed Al Fateh Al Khalifa in 1812. In the 19th century the fort was a residence for Sheikh Salman bin Ahmed Al Fateh and then it was inherited by his grand children. Riffa Fort is now known as Sheikh Salman bin Ahmed Fort and offers a splendid view across the Hunanaiya valley. With Riffa being home to the seat of government until 1869, this fort is of considerable historical significance.

Sheikh Isa bin Ali Al Khalifa, who ruled Bahrain from 1869 to 1932, was born in this fort. His house in Muharraq provides a glimpse of royal life in the 19th century, complete with architecture and wall carvings belonging to that era. It is also one of the best places to feel the effects of the wind tower. 

It was officially opened for visitors in 1993.

See also 
 List of archaeological sites in Bahrain

References 

Forts in Bahrain
Archaeological sites in Bahrain
1812 establishments in Asia
Riffa